La Ferrière (Gallo: La Ferierr) is a former commune in the Côtes-d'Armor department of Brittany in north-western France. On 1 January 2016, it was merged into the new commune Les Moulins, which was renamed Plémet in December 2017.

Population

Inhabitants of La Ferrière are called in French ferrandiers.

See also
Communes of the Côtes-d'Armor department
List of works of the two Folgoët ateliers

References

External links

Former communes of Côtes-d'Armor